Still Walkin' is the third album by Coo Coo Cal, released on May 14, 2002 through Infinite Records. Most of the album was produced by Bigg Hank, though a then unknown Andre "Dre" Lyon (of the production duo Cool & Dre) contributed production for two of the album's 20 tracks.

Released less than a year after his major-label debut, Disturbed and his breakthrough single "My Projects", Cal had parted ways with Tommy Boy Records and quickly released Still Walkin''' independently. The album managed to peak at number 30 on the Billboard'' Top R&B/Hip-Hop Albums and 17 on the Top Independent Albums, making it his last charting album to date.

Track listing
"Intro" - 1:54
"Why They Call Him Crazy" - 4:03
"Ghetto 2 Ghetto" - 4:14 (featuring Outlawz and Mr. Do It To Death)
"You Got Me Fuck Up" - 4:30
"Skit" - 1:28
"Stealing Hoes" - 4:13
"Eyes of the Smooth One" - 3:36
"Skit" - 0:41
"Bad to the Bone" - 3:05
"Dealing with a Mob" - 3:32
"Ride Till We Die" - 4:15 (featuring Twista)
"Fuck Your Vest" - 3:39
"I Remember" - 3:40
"No Mercy" - 4:58
"Skit" - 1:15
"Game Still Recognize Game" - 5:40
"Get Down or Lay Down" - 7:32
"Coke Cola Oznola" - 3:40
"Bad Ass Bitch" - 1:29
Untitled - 1:55

Chart history

2002 albums